Deborah Ascher Barnstone (born 1959) is an author, historian and a professor at the University of Technology Sydney.

Biography
Barnstone earned an undergraduate degree from Barnard College, a Master of Architecture degree from Columbia University, and a PhD in architectural history from the Delft University of Technology.

Selected works 
 Beyond the Bauhaus: Cultural Modernity in Breslau, 1918–33. (University of Michigan Press, 2016).

References

Further reading

1959 births
Living people
Australian women writers
Writers from Sydney
Barnard College alumni
Columbia Graduate School of Architecture, Planning and Preservation alumni
Delft University of Technology alumni
Academic staff of the University of Technology Sydney